Lois Meredith (alternative styling Loïs Mérédith) (June 26, 1897 – January 15, 1967) was a silent film and theatre actress.

Career
She infrequently appeared on the Broadway stage from 1911 to 1926. Meredith appeared in 22 films, of which 21 were made between 1914 and 1922, with a 15-years gap before her final uncredited minor film role in 1937.

Filmography

 The Conspiracy (1914) as Margaret Holt
 Dan (1914) as Lila Dabney
 The Seats of the Mighty (1914) as Mathilde
 An Enemy to Society (1915) as Decima Duress
 The Greater Will (1915) as Peggy Sloane
 Help Wanted (1915) as Gertie Meyers
 The Legacy of Folly (1915) as Constance
 My Best Girl (1915) as Dora Lane
 The Woman (1915) as Wanda Kelly
 The Precious Parcel (also known as The Precious Packet) (1916) as Jacqueline Bourbon
 Spellbound (1916) as Elsie York
 The Girl Who Can Cook (1917)
 In the Hands of the Law (1917)
 Sold at Auction (1917) as Nan
 Her Mistake (1918) as Viola Shepard
 On the Quiet (1918) as Agnes Colt
 Over the Top (1918) as Helen Lloyd
 Autour du Mystère (1920)
 Le Secret de Rosette Lambert (also known as The Secret of Rosette Lambert) (1920) as Rosette Lambert
 L'Inconnue (1921) (as Loïs Mérédith)
 The Headless Horseman (1922) as Katrina Van Tassel
 Conquest (also known as Marie Walewska) (1937) as Countess Potocka (uncredited)

Notes

External links

Brief biography

1897 births
1967 deaths
American silent film actresses
American stage actresses
People from Atlantic, Iowa
Actresses from Iowa
20th-century American actresses